The 2021 Honda Idemitsu Asia Talent Cup was the seventh season of the Asia Talent Cup. Japanese rider Taiyo Furusato won the championship after winning every race, while Malaysian Danial Sharil finished in second, and Gun Mie in third.

Entry list

Calendar
The following Grand prix were the scheduled Grand prix for the 2021 Asia Talent Cup.

Cancelled Races
The following Grand prix were the scheduled Grand prix for the 2021 Asia Talent Cup, but were cancelled.

Results

The following results are the official race results of the 2021 Asia Talent Cup.

Riders' Championship standings

Scoring System

Points are awarded to the top fifteen finishers. A rider has to finish the race to earn points.

{|
|

References

External links 

 

Asia Talent Cup
2021 in motorcycle sport